The northern map turtle (Graptemys geographica), also known as the common map turtle, is an aquatic turtle in the family Emydidae. It is endemic to North America.

Description

The northern map turtle gets both its common and scientific names from the markings on its carapace, which resemble contour lines on a map or chart. These lines are usually shades of yellow, tan, or orange, and are surrounded by dark borders, with the rest of the carapace being olive or greyish brown. However, the carapace markings tend to fade as the animal matures, and in older individuals are usually only visible when the shell is wet. The carapace has a hydrodynamic appearance and is broad with a moderately low keel. The rear of the carapace is flared and the rear marginals form serrations. The plastron is yellowish and is marked by a central dark blotch (plastral figure) that follows the sutures of the plastral scutes and fades with age so that many adults lack a pattern all together (i.e., the plastron is immaculate). The head, neck, limbs and tail are dark green with thin yellow stripes, and an oval or triangular spot is located behind each eye. Females have a much wider head than males and this is associated with differences in feeding. Males have a narrower carapace with more distinct keel, narrower head, and a longer, thicker tail. Unlike females, the opening of the cloaca is beyond the rear edge of the carapace. Young map turtles have a pronounced dorsal keel.

Distribution
Northern map turtles inhabit an area from south Quebec and Ontario to northern Vermont where it lives in the St. Lawrence River drainage basin. Its range extends west through the Great Lakes and into southern Wisconsin and eastern Minnesota, west of the Appalachians, south to Kansas and northwestern Georgia. It also occurs in the Susquehanna River system in Pennsylvania and Maryland and the Delaware River. Also, a small European population occurs in the Czech Republic, which was formed from escaped or released turtles and their descendants. In the Czech Republic, this turtle is considered an alien species, but is threatened together with Czech native turtles, other reptiles and amphibians by a large population of another invasive turtle, Trachemys scripta elegans.

Habitat
The northern map turtle inhabits ponds, rivers, and lakes. They prefer large bodies of water and areas with fallen trees and other debris for basking. These turtles are more often found in rivers than in lakes or ponds. They are found in larger rivers and lakes in the northern portion of their range but are more likely to live in smaller rocky rivers and streams in the south and west. Since they are turtles, naturally they need the sun to survive.

Ecology and behaviour
This turtle is dormant November through April, depending on local climatic factors. Northern map turtles spend the winter under water and do not surface to breathe, especially when ice cover makes this impossible. Adults rest on the bottom or wedged underneath rocks or logs and often hibernate communally with other northern map turtles where they may remain somewhat active. Hibernacula must be well oxygenated because, unlike some other turtle species such as painted turtles, map turtles need to absorb oxygen from the water to survive the winter. They typically bask in groups and are diurnal, meaning they are active exclusively in daylight hours. Northern map turtles are also quite shy and difficult to approach; they usually slip into the water and hide at the first hint of danger.

Reproduction
Northern map turtles breed in the spring and fall. Most mating takes place in deep waters. The nesting period lasts from May to July. Unshaded sites with sandy soil are highly preferred. The female usually chooses well-drained areas for depositing the eggs. The nest cavity is dug with the hind feet. The size of the clutch is between six and 20. After the eggs are laid, the cavity is filled. They hatch after 50 to 70 days of incubation, and most hatchlings emerge in August to September. When a nest hatches late, the northern map turtle hatchlings have been known to overwinter in the nest. The female usually lays two or more clutches in one breeding season. The sexes of the young are determined by the temperature. At , incubation produces a majority of males, whereas  yields more females.

Diet
Map turtles are more carnivorous than most other members of the family Emydidae, and the northern map turtle is no exception. Adult females have wide heads, strong jaws and broad alveolar crushing surfaces in their mouths which they use to feed on molluscs, their primary prey, as well as insects and crayfish. Adult males are much smaller and have narrower heads and feed on smaller molluscs and insects. Like most other aquatic turtles, feeding always takes place in the water. In places where invasive molluscs such as zebra mussels and Asian clams (Corbicula fluminea) are abundant, they may become the most important food of female northern map turtles.

Existing protection and conservation status
Map turtles are considered habitat specialists and may be replaced by a more tolerant species when their habitat is altered. Unfortunately the effects of human interference by way boating and recreation on shorelines are likely impeding the map turtle from re-establishing itself in natural areas. Thus, populations of Northern map turtles have probably declined across their entire natural range but they remain widespread and may be abundant in some locations. This species has classified as least concern by the IUCN.

United States  
Collecting, keeping, and selling of northern map turtles is prohibited by Animals in Captivity regulations in nine states. It is considered endangered in Kansas, Kentucky, and Maryland.

Canada  
Like most jurisdictions of the United States, Canada lists northern map turtles as a species of special concern. This means that they are being threatened by something but are not yet endangered. They are being watched carefully.

References

Further reading
 Conant, R., and J.T. Collins. (1998). Reptiles and Amphibians of Eastern and Central North America. Third Edition. Expanded. New York: Houghton Mifflin. 640 pp.  (paperback). (Graptemys geographica, pp. 167–168 + Plates 3, 6.)
 Harding, J. (1997). Amphibians and Reptiles of the Great Lakes Region. Michigan: The University of Michigan Press. 400 pp. .
 MacCulloch, R.D. (2002). The ROM Field Guide to Amphibians and Reptiles of Ontario. ROM/McClelland & Stewart. 168 pp. A ROM Science Publication.
Le Sueur, C.A. (1817). An Account of an American species of Tortoise, not noticed in the systems. Journ. Acad. Nat. Sci. Philadelphia 1(1):86-88 + Plate V. (Testudo geographica)
Smith, H.M., and E.D. Brodie Jr. (1982). Reptiles of North America: A Guide to Field Identification. Golden Press. New York. 240 pp.  (paperback). (Graptemys geographica, pp. 50–51.)

External links

Northern Map Turtle, Illinois Natural History Survey
Common Map Turtle, Reptiles and Amphibians of Iowa
Common Map Turtle, Savannah River Ecological Laboratory

Graptemys
Turtles of North America
Reptiles of the United States
Reptiles of Ontario
Fauna of the Eastern United States
Fauna of the Great Lakes region (North America)
Least concern biota of North America
Least concern biota of the United States
Reptiles described in 1817

pl:Żółw ostrogrzbiety